Crenicichla lenticulata is a species of cichlid native to South America. it is found in the Negro River basin of the Amazon River basin in Brazil.

References

lenticulata
Freshwater fish of Brazil
Fish of the Amazon basin
Fish described in 1840
Taxa named by Johann Jakob Heckel